Fiumara is a comune (municipality) in the Metropolitan City of Reggio Calabria in the Italian region Calabria, located about  southwest of Catanzaro and about  northeast of Reggio Calabria. 
Fiumara borders the following municipalities: Calanna, Campo Calabro, Reggio Calabria, San Roberto, Scilla, Villa San Giovanni.

References

Cities and towns in Calabria